Jamie Bennell (born 7 June 1989) is a former professional Australian rules footballer who played for the Melbourne Football Club and the West Coast Eagles in the Australian Football League (AFL). Originally from Bunbury, Western Australia, he was recruited by Melbourne in the 2008 National draft, and played 57 games for the club before being delisted at the end of the 2012 AFL season. He was then redrafted by West Coast in the 2013 Rookie draft, and played an additional 30 games before again being delisted at the end of the 2016 season.

Career
Bennell is from Bunbury, Western Australia, where he attended Bunbury Senior High School. Originally playing for the Carey Park Football Club in the South West Football League (SWFL), he played colts for the Swan Districts Football Club before being selected by Melbourne in the third round at pick 35 in the 2008 National draft. He had previously been playing with Swan Districts in the West Australian Football League. Bennell was named to make his debut for Melbourne in the opening round of the 2009 AFL season together with Neville Jetta, who also played for Swan Districts and played alongside Bennell since primary school in Bunbury, Western Australia

Bennell played predominantly across half-back during his debut season for the Demons, usually manning opposition small forwards, and playing a total of 16 games. The following season saw Bennell move into attack as a small crumbing forward, earning both mark and goal of the year nominations against the Western Bulldogs in round 7. The following fortnight Bennell had a career best four-goal game against Port Adelaide Football Club, his form however began to taper off towards the end of the season as he was dropped for round 22. At the end of the 2012 season, Bennell was delisted. He had suffered a serious knee injury towards the end of the season, when playing against the Fremantle Football Club. In the 2013 Rookie draft, held in December 2012, he was re-drafted by West Coast with the 26th pick overall.

Bennell was delisted by West Coast at the end of the 2016 AFL season, having managed only two games during that season.

References

External links

DemonWiki profile

1989 births
Australian rules footballers from Western Australia
Carey Park Football Club players
Indigenous Australian players of Australian rules football
Living people
Melbourne Football Club players
People from Bunbury, Western Australia
Swan Districts Football Club players
West Coast Eagles players
East Perth Football Club players
Casey Demons players